This is a list of university art museums and galleries in New York State.

See also
 University art museums and galleries in the United States
 List of museums in New York (state)
 List of nature centers in New York
 List of State University of New York units
List of university museums in the United States

References

External links 
 Association of Academic Museums and Galleries (AAMG)
 The American Alliance of Museums (AAM)

 
New York State